The 1966–67 season was Kilmarnock's 65th in Scottish League competitions. They finished 7th out of 18 clubs in Scottish Division One. They reached the semi finals of the Inter-Cities Fairs Cup.

Scottish Division One

Scottish League Cup

Group stage

Group 2 final table

Scottish Cup

Inter-Cities Fairs Cup

See also
List of Kilmarnock F.C. seasons
Kilmarnock F.C. in European football

References

External links
https://www.fitbastats.com/kilmarnock/team_results_season.php?from=46&competition=0&update=Update

Kilmarnock F.C. seasons
Kilmarnock